Prešna Loka is a small settlement in the hills northeast of Sevnica in the historical region of Styria in east-central Slovenia. The Municipality of Sevnica is part of the Lower Sava Statistical Region.

References

External links
Prešna Loka at Geopedia

Populated places in the Municipality of Sevnica